The Utah Pride Center (UPC) is a tax-exempt nonprofit organization in Salt Lake City. It provides services, events and activities to lesbian, gay, bisexual and transgender (LGBT) people in Utah. The center manages annual and ongoing projects including the Utah Pride Festival.

History
Three LGBT centers were created in Utah from the 1970s through the 1990s. The name of the most recent center, Utah Stonewall Center, has been changed three times since its creation in 1991 as a project of the Gay and Lesbian Community Council of Utah.

Gay Community Services Center Inc.

The first LGBT community center in Utah was the Gay Community Services Center Inc. in 1975 through 1979. Its executive directors were Dorothy Makin and Ken Storer.

Gay Community Service Center and Clinic

The Gay Community Service Center and Clinic was created in 1984. Its executive directors were Auntie Dé and Beau Chainé.

Utah Stonewall Center

The Utah Stonewall Center was created in 1991 through 1996 as a project of the Gay and Lesbian Community Council of Utah. The executive directors of the center were Craig Miller, Melissa Sillitoe, John Bennett, Renee Rinaldi, Michael O’Brien and Alan Ahtow.

Gay and Lesbian Community Center of Utah

The center was renamed in 1997 through 2004 as the Gay and Lesbian Community Center of Utah. Its executive directors were Monique Predovitch, Doug Wortham and Paula Wolfe.

Gay Lesbian Bisexual Transgender Community Center of Utah

The center was renamed in 2003 as the Gay Lesbian Bisexual Transgender Community Center of Utah. Its executive directors were Chad Beyer and Valerie A. Larabee.

Utah Pride Center

The center was renamed in 2006 as the Utah Pride Center. Larabee resigned in 2013 as the center executive director after it experienced struggles with financial and leadership issues, and its staffers assumed her duties until a new executive director was appointed. Center Treasurer Steven Ha was appointed in 2014 to serve as the center interim executive director, and was later employed for one year as the center executive director. On December 12, 2014, less than a year after his appointment, the Utah Pride Center announced the resignation of Steven Ha due to a recurrence of lymphoma. Marian Edmonds-Allen was named Executive Director in August 2015.  Carol Gnade was named Executive Director October 1, 2015, with a mandate to move to a new building.  Robert Moolman was named Executive Director May 1, 2018.  Stacey Jackson-Roberts was named CEO August 18th, 2021.

Programs
Health & Wellness
Social Programs
Advocacy & Education
LGBTQ Elders 50+
Transgender
Youth
Support Groups

Additionally, the center provides meeting space, financial assistance and guidance to a number of smaller organizations known as affiliate programs, sponsors inter-organizational programs such the Utah GLBT Leadership Task Force and Utah GLBT Mental Health Task Force.

Library

The Utah Stonewall Library was founded in June 1991 by Robert Smith and Liza Smart, Chairs of the Utah Stonewall Committee of The Gay and Lesbian Community Council of Utah (GLCCU). It was an integral part of the Utah Stonewall Center from its inception and was established as a community-based information center, dedicated to the promotion of Lesbian and Gay visibility and viability by means of the accumulation of Bisexual, Gay, Lesbian and Transgender archives, literature, music, film, art, history, culture, humor, education and fiction - and the dissemination of these materials to the public at large. The selection criteria included authors, stories, characters or titles that are LGBT+ affirming or iconic figures that were influenced by the community. The lending library is based on the honor system and a first name basis, allowing anyone to provide their chosen name/identities and to feel free to study and read topics of their interests free of shame and stigma.

In addition, the special collections section included the following Utah Stonewall Historical Society and Archives for Gay and Lesbian Studies, Stonewall Center and Utah Pride Center materials: administrative files, brochures, committee files, contracts, daily office files, financial documents, historical records, manuals, meeting minutes, memorabilia, newsletters, office files, office references, organization files, pamphlets, photos, physical objects, posters, publications and subject files.

These library archives have been donated and now reside as the Utah Pride Center (1975-2012) set at the University of Utah, Special Collections, J. Willard Marriott Library. New material up to 2017 exists, but will not be available until indexed.

In 1996 the library had reached ~2,000 books -- but a temporary closure resulted in a bulk loss of books and archives.  By 2017, the library had once again expanded to ~3,400 books.

In 2017, Cureton and UPC executive director Carol Gnade arranged for the Salt Lake City Library to host the lending collection at the Main Library branch. This made the library available to the public at-large, and also saved valuable space at the new UPC location. This arrangement extends to 2022.

The catalog set can be seen at the External Link below.

See also

List of LGBT community centers
Utah Pride Festival

Notes

References
Gay and Lesbian Community Center of Utah records. Accession number (Accn) 1918. Salt Lake City: Special Collections and Archives, J. Willard Marriott Library, University of Utah. 2001.

External links
Utah Pride Center
Interview with Utah Pride Center Director of Development and Marketing Marina Gomberg, Aug 10, 2009
Interview with Utah Pride Center Media & Special Events Coordinator Michael Westley, Aug 11, 2009
Utah Pride Center Library
Library catalog at Salt Lake City Public Library, Main Branch until 2022
Library catalog at Library Thing, legacy search
Special collections at University of Utah, Marriott Library

Non-profit organizations based in Utah
LGBT community centers in the United States
LGBT in Utah
1970s establishments in Utah
Organizations based in Salt Lake City